The women's 100 metres event at the 2019 European Athletics U23 Championships was held in Gävle, Sweden, at Gavlehof Stadium Park on 11 and 12 July.

Records
Prior to the competition, the records were as follows:

Results

Heats

Qualification rule: First 3 (Q) and the next 4 fastest (q) qualified for the semifinals.

Wind:Heat 1: -1.8 m/s, Heat 2: -2.8 m/s, Heat 3: -4.2 m/s, Heat 4: -2.3 m/s

Semifinals
12 July

Qualification rule: First 3 (Q) and the next 2 fastest (q) qualified for the final.

Wind:Heat 1: -0.7 m/s, Heat 2: -1.4 m/s

Final

12 July

Wind: +0.6 m/s

References

100 metres
100 metres at the European Athletics U23 Championships